Shikaari is psychological thriller novel written by Yashwant Vithoba Chittal. The book shikaari is considered as one of the finest novel written in Kannada. This novel related corporate workplace in India. Shikari tells the story of Nagnath, a migrant from north Karnataka who has risen to a high-ranking position in a chemicals corporation in Bombay.

References

Kannada novels